The Acaú-Goiana Extractive Reserve is an extractive reserve in the states of Paraíba and Pernambuco, Brazil.

Location

It is in the municipalities of Caaporã (5.07%) and Pitimbu (1.16%) in Paraíba and Goiana (62.08%) in Pernambuco.
The reserve is in the coastal marine biome.
It includes the estuary of the Tracunhaém River.
Vegetation includes mangroves, restinga and a small strip of Atlantic Forest.

Administration

The Acaú-Goiana Extractive Reserve was created by federal decree on 26 September 2007, and is administered by the Chico Mendes Institute for Biodiversity Conservation.
It is classed as IUCN protected area category VI (protected area with sustainable use of natural resources).
The extractive reserve aims to protect the livelihoods and ensure use and conservation of natural resources traditionally used by the communities of Carne de Vaca, Povoação de São Lourenço, Tejucupapo, Baldo do Rio Goiana, Acaú, and other communities in the reserve.
On 10 November 2009 the Instituto Nacional de Colonização e Reforma Agrária (INCRA: National Institute for Colonization and Agrarian Reform) recognised the reserve as meeting the needs of 1,510 families.
A deliberative council was created on 24 October 2012.

Notes

Sources

2007 establishments in Brazil
Extractive reserves of Brazil
Protected areas of Pernambuco
Protected areas of Paraíba